Domingo González (24 December 1947 – 16 July 1979) was a Colombian footballer who competed in the 1972 Summer Olympics.

Career
Born in Tumaco, González played as a midfielder for Santa Fe. He won the Colombian league with the club in 1971. He also played for Independiente Medellín, Deportes Quindío, Cúcuta Deportivo, Once Caldas and Deportes Tolima.

Personal
González died in a bus accident.

References

1947 births
1979 deaths
Association football midfielders
Colombian footballers
Olympic footballers of Colombia
Footballers at the 1972 Summer Olympics
Independiente Santa Fe footballers
People from Tumaco
Road incident deaths in Colombia
Sportspeople from Nariño Department
20th-century Colombian people